Il Suicidio dei Samurai is the third album by the Italian alternative-rock band Verdena, released in 2004.

Track list

Logorrea (esperti all'opera) – 3:54
Luna – 3:32
Mina – 4:27
Balanite – 4:47
Phantastica – 4:01
Elefante – 3:06
Glamodrama – 6:27
Far fisa – 4:23
17 tir nel cortile – 5:10
40 secondi di niente – 4:45
Il suicidio del samurai – 4:28

References

2004 albums
Universal Music Italy albums
Verdena albums